Palosuo Islands is a group of small islands and rocks lying  north of Maurstad Point, off the west side of Renaud Island in the Biscoe Islands. First accurately shown on an Argentine government chart of 1957. Named by the United Kingdom Antarctic Place-Names Committee (UK-APC) in 1959 for Erkki Palosuo, Finnish oceanographer who has specialized in sea ice studies.

See also 
 List of Antarctic and sub-Antarctic islands

Islands of the Biscoe Islands